Jeff Gaither (born 1962 in Louisville, Kentucky) is a graphic artist noted for his many pictures for the music industry.

Gaither has been practicing his particular blend of horror and rock art for over 25 years. He has created art for The Misfits, Guns N' Roses, Look Afraid, The Undead, Biohazard, Insane Clown Posse, Accused and many more bands of all genres. He blames it all on his aunt, who in his youth bought him copies of Famous Monsters of Filmland, and took him to movies like The Exorcist and Night of the Living Dead. Jeff is a visual artist, digital artist, photographer, sculptor.

Major accomplishments and relevant contributions
Created art for an estimated 300+ music CD covers
Created art for 2500+ magazine/fanzine covers
Art appears worldwide on posters, prints, clothing, skateboards, skis, glassware, stickers, magazines, book covers, and more
Art published in Art of Modern Rock: The Poster Explosion, 2004

Notes

External links
 Official website for Jeff Gaither
 Scare Halloween trick-or-treaters with artist Jeff Gaither's missing screen prank

1962 births
Living people
Artists from Louisville, Kentucky
American graphic designers